The Donoho Creek Formation is a Mesozoic geologic formation in South Carolina. Dinosaur remains are among the fossils that have been recovered from the formation.

Dinosaurs known from the formation:

 Appalachiosaurus montgomeriensis
 Saurornitholestes langstoni
 Hadrosauridae indet.
 Ornithomimosauria indet.

See also

 List of dinosaur-bearing rock formations
 List of stratigraphic units with indeterminate dinosaur fossils

Footnotes

References
 Weishampel, David B.; Dodson, Peter; and Osmólska, Halszka (eds.): The Dinosauria, 2nd, Berkeley: University of California Press. 861 pp. .

Maastrichtian Stage of North America
Cretaceous geology of South Carolina